The Games is an Australian mockumentary television series about the 2000 Summer Olympics in Sydney. The series was originally broadcast on the ABC and had two seasons of 13 episodes each, the first in 1998 and the second in 2000.

The Games starred satirists John Clarke and Bryan Dawe, along with Australian comedian Gina Riley and actor Nicholas Bell.

Series 1 (1998)

Series 2 (2000)

References

External links

Games